Ben Bowyang was an Australian newspaper comic strip created by the cartoonist Alex Gurney. It debuted in 1936.

Following the misadventures of two larrikin soldiers, the strip was based on the "Gunn's Gully" newspaper humor columns written during the 1920s and 1930s by C. J. Dennis of the Melbourne Herald. Dennis wrote about a philosophical farmer, Ben Bowyang, from Gunn's Gully.

The first six installments appeared on a full page in the Picture-News in November and the comic strip was moved to the Sun News-Pictorial on 1 February 1940.

The strip was also drawn by Mick Armstrong, Keith Martin, Sir Lionel Lindsay, Alex McRae, Peter Russell-Clarke and Sam Wells. During its later years it appeared in The Melbourne Herald, where it ceased publication in 1979.

References

Australian comic strips
1936 comics debuts
1979 comics endings
Gag-a-day comics
Bowyang, Ben
Bowyang, Ben
Australian comics characters
Bowyang, Ben
Comics set in Australia